Mount Lafayette is a  mountain at the northern end of the Franconia Range in the White Mountains of New Hampshire, United States. It lies in the town of Franconia in Grafton County, and appears on the New England Fifty Finest list of the most topographically prominent peaks in New England. The mountain's upper reaches are located in the alpine zone, an area where only dwarf vegetation exists due to the harsh climate.

The mountain

Mount Lafayette is the highest point in the Franconia Range, a line of peaks along the east side of Franconia Notch.  It is the sixth highest peak in New Hampshire and the highest outside of the Presidential Range. It is the second most prominent peak in the state.

On the western side, its lower slopes lie inside Franconia Notch State Park.  The remainder of the mountain lies within the White Mountain National Forest.  The summit marks the western border of the Pemigewasset Wilderness Area within the WMNF.

Trails
A variety of trails lead up over 3,000 vertical feet (900 m) to its exposed summit. The Greenleaf Trail begins at the parking lot for the Cannon Mountain tramway and ascends to the Appalachian Mountain Club's Greenleaf Hut, then continues to the summit. The Bridle Path trail follows a western spur ridge of Lafayette from Lafayette Place Campground on Interstate 93 past Greenleaf Hut and joins the Greenleaf Trail, reaching the summit  after the hut. The peak is at the junction of the Garfield Ridge Trail, which follows the ridge northeast to Mount Garfield, and the Franconia Ridge Trail, which leads south to Mounts Lincoln, Liberty, and Flume.  Both the Garfield Ridge Trail and the Franconia Ridge Trail form part of the Appalachian Trail.  

A very popular hike is to make a loop combining the three most notable summits of the Franconia Range. The loop starts with the Old Bridle Path to the AMC Greenleaf Hut. From there, one takes the Greenleaf Trail to the summit of Mt. Lafayette. Turning south along the Franconia Ridge Trail, one passes over Mount Lincoln and Little Haystack, then descends via the Falling Waters Trail, which connects back with the beginning of the Old Bridle Path.

History
The mountain is named to honor General Gilbert du Motier, Marquis de La Fayette, a French military hero who fought with and significantly aided the Continental Army during the American Revolutionary War. Loved and adopted as an aide by George Washington during the conflict, Lafayette made a triumphal tour re-visiting New Hampshire and all the other then states in 1824-1825 celebrating the 50th anniversary of the Battle of Bunker Hill.

Notes and citations

See also 

 White Mountains Region
 List of mountains in New Hampshire

External links 
 19th-century Paintings of Mount Lafayette
 
  PeakBagger.com: Mount Lafayette
  Summitpost.org: Mount Lafayette
 AMC: Hiking Mount Lafayette
  hikethewhites.com: Mount Lafayette

Mountains of New Hampshire
White Mountains (New Hampshire)
Mountains of Grafton County, New Hampshire
New England Four-thousand footers
Mountains on the Appalachian Trail
Gilbert du Motier, Marquis de Lafayette